P-42 or P42 may refer to:

Vessels 
 , a corvette of the Argentine Navy
 , a submarine of the Royal Navy
 , a patrol vessel of the Irish Naval Service

Other uses 
 Curtiss XP-42, an American experimental fighter aircraft
 GE P42, a diesel locomotive
 Lake City Air Force Station, a closed United States Air Force radar station in Tennessee
 MAPK1, p42 mitogen-activated protein kinase
 Papyrus 42, a biblical manuscript
 Phosphorus-42, an isotope of phosphorus
 P42, a Latvian state regional road
 P-42, a specially redesigned record-setting Sukhoi Su-27 Soviet fighter aircraft